Viettesia is a genus of moths in the subfamily Arctiinae from Madagascar. The genus was erected by Hervé de Toulgoët in 1959.

Species
Viettesia aequalis Toulgoët, 1959
Viettesia bella Toulgoët, 1959
Viettesia bicolor Toulgoët, 1980
Viettesia bimaculosa Toulgoët, 1959
Viettesia brunneomixta Toulgoët, 1959
Viettesia erastrioides Toulgoët, 1959
Viettesia griseovariegata (Toulgoët, 1954)
Viettesia hampsoni Toulgoët, 1959
Viettesia incerta Toulgoët, 1959
Viettesia infuscata Toulgoët, 1959
Viettesia lucida Toulgoët, 1959
Viettesia luctuosa Toulgoët, 1959
Viettesia matilei Toulgoët, 1978
Viettesia modesta Toulgoët, 1959
Viettesia multistrigata Toulgoët, 1959
Viettesia ornatrix Toulgoët, 1959
Viettesia pantherina Toulgoët, 1959
Viettesia perroti Toulgoët, 1959
Viettesia plumicornis (Butler, 1882)
Viettesia proxima Toulgoët, 1959
Viettesia rufibasis Toulgoët, 1959
Viettesia transversa Toulgoët, 1959
Viettesia tristis Toulgoët, 1959
Viettesia unipuncta Toulgoët, 1959
Viettesia viettei Toulgoët, 1959
Viettesia virginalis Toulgoët, 1959

Former species
Viettesia geminata (Mabille, 1900)

References

Lithosiini